Eridania may refer to:

 Eridania Lake
 Eridania Planitia
 Eridania quadrangle